Valence Sportif was a French rugby union club based in Valence, Drôme. The team last competed in Fédérale 2, the fourth division of French rugby. Valence were established in 1905, and played in white and red. In 2010, the club merged with nearby La Voulte Sportif to form the current club ROC La Voulte-Valence (French: Rhône ovalie club La Voulte-Valence).

Honours
 Deuxième Division:
 Runners-up: 1962
 Challenge Jules Cadenat:
 Runners-up: 1976

Famous players
Élie Cester
Sébastien Chabal
Gerard Rousset

See also
 List of rugby union clubs in France

External links
Sport

French rugby union clubs
Sport in Drôme
Valence, Drôme
Rugby clubs established in 1905
1905 establishments in France
Rugby clubs disestablished in 2010
2010 disestablishments in France